Flyhistorisk Museum, Sola (Sola Aviation Museum) is an aviation museum located in Stavanger Airport, Sola, near Stavanger, Norway. The museum was founded in 1984 and is run by local volunteers. Flyhistorisk Museum, Sola went into cooperation with Jærmuseet in January 2012.

Facilities 
The museum is housed in an old aircraft hangar at the former seaplane base at Stavanger Airport, built by German labour during World War II.

In the hangar, the museum houses the display, as well as a small café (with interior from a former bar for one of the fighter squadrons stationed at the airport), in addition to a workshop, where currently an Arado Ar 96, a Caproni Ca.310 bomber, a Heinkel He 115 armed seaplane  are under restoration.

Flyhistorisk Museum, Sola is open between noon and 4:00 pm every Sunday from May through November, and daily except Monday in the school summer holiday.

Collection 
The collection of the museum includes civilian, military and general aviation aircraft. Stavanger Lufthavn, Sola was the maintenance hub for Braathens S.A.F.E and Helikopter Service. The airport was also an active airforce base for Luftwaffe during World War II and for Royal Norwegian Air Force during the cold war. The museum has primarily concentrated its exhibition around its local history.

The museum has an extensive collection of German World War II aircraft including the latest rollout of a Messerschmitt Bf 109 in june 2020. In addition to what is probably the only remaining, or at least most complete Arado Ar 96, and the airframe of an Arado Ar 196 which was stationed on the German cruiser Blücher when she was sunk in the Oslofjord in April 1940.

The collection also contains an example of every post-war jet that has been with the Royal Norwegian Air Force including some trainers.

The museum houses examples of civilian aircraft, from floatplanes to radial engined airliners.
A ex. Braathens S.A.F.E  Douglas DC-6 has arrived the airport and will join the collection in August 2020.

Aircraft on display

Civilian 
Douglas DC-6, LN-SUB, used by Braathens S.A.F.E.  ex. N151 with Everts Air Cargo
Fokker F.27 Friendship 100, LN-SUF, used by Braathens S.A.F.E and Busy Bee
Convair CV-440 Metropolitan, LN-KLK in the colors of Norsk Metropolitan Klubb. Used by SAS and Norfly
Noorduyn Norseman, c/n 92 LN-BDR used by RNoAF and Fjellfly!
De Havilland DH-114 Heron 1B, in the colors of Braathens S.A.F.E.  ex. Garuda Indonesia PH-GHB and BUIA G-AOXL
Aero Grand Commander 680, formerly used by the Norwegian Environmental Protection Agency (Statens Forurensingstilsyn)
Bell 47, in the colours of Helikopter Service
Piper J-3 Cub 43-30382 / LN-NAU
Aérospatiale SA 332 Super Puma LN-OMC in restoration
Eon Baby Type 8 (glider) c/n 018 LN-GBI
Scheibe Bergfalke (glider) c/n 202 LN-GBH

Royal Norwegian Air Force aircraft 
Bell UH-1B 61-0688
Canadair CF-104 Starfighter
Caproni Ca.310 c/n 361
Consolidated PBY Catalina (ex. L-857 Royal Danish Air Force)
deHavilland DH115 Vampire T Mk.55 U-1217 (in Swiss colors)
Fairchild PT-26 Cornell c/n T43-4646 L-DD/LN-BIO
Lockheed T-33A T-Bird (ex. DT571 Royal Danish Air Force) 51-6571
North American F-86F Sabre 53-1082
North American F-86K 54-1266
Northrop F-5A Freedom Fighter 66-9220
Republic F-84G Thunderjet 51-10161 / MU-Z
Republic RF-84F Thunderflash 51-17045 / T3-N
Saab Safirc/n 91336

Luftwaffe 
Arado Ar 66 in restoration
Arado Ar 96 werk. 4246 in restoration
Arado Ar 196 original wreck from the German cruiser Blücher
Fieseler Fi 156 Storch (in World War II Luftwaffe colors)
Heinkel He 115 in conservation
Messerschmitt Bf 109

Engines
Argus As 10
BMW 132
Orenda J79
Pratt & Whitney JT8D
Ranger L-440
Rolls-Royce Merlin
Wright R-3350 Duplex-Cyclone

Stored aircraft
Antonov An-2 registration LY-AEQ
Auster T7 c/n B617 ex.G-ASCF / SE-ELO
Cessna O-1 Bird Dog
de Havilland Tiger Moth 151
Dornier Do 28A-1 registration LN-LMZ
Grumman G-44 Widgeon registration LN-HAL
North American Harvard
Piper PA-38 Tomahawk registration LN-BFO
Saab RF-35 Draken AR-114
Taylorcraft A c/n 416 registration LN-FAG

References

External links
Flyhistorisk Museum Sola official site

Aerospace museums in Norway
Museums in Rogaland
Technology museums in Norway